Sean Redell Kilpatrick (born January 6, 1990) is an American professional basketball player for the Fujian Sturgeons of the Chinese Basketball Association (CBA). A 6'4" shooting guard born in Yonkers, New York, during his senior season of 2013–14 with the Cincinnati Bearcats, he was named AP first-team All-American.

High school career
Kilpatrick starred at White Plains Senior High School, where he averaged 28.4 points, 7 rebounds and 6 assists per game over his four-year career. He then spent a post-graduate year at Notre Dame Preparatory School in Fitchburg, Massachusetts.

College career
Kilpatrick redshirted what would have been his freshman season at Cincinnati in 2009–10, as he played the same position as top recruit Lance Stephenson.

In his first season with the Bearcats, Kilpatrick was part of the regular rotation, averaging 9.7 points per game in 20.6 minutes per game.  As a sophomore, his role and minutes expanded and he increased his scoring average to 14.3 per game.  He led the Big East Conference in made three-point shots and three-pointers per game and was named second team All-Conference at the conclusion of the season. As a junior in 2012–13, Kilpatrick again raised his scoring average as he tallied 17 points per game and repeated on the second team All-Big East squad.

In the summer between his junior and senior seasons, Kilpatrick was selected to represent the United States as a member of the men's national team at the 2013 Summer Universiade in Kazan, Russia. He averaged 7.5 points per game as the team finished ninth.

At the beginning of his senior season, Kilpatrick was named preseason first team all-conference by the American Athletic Conference. On February 19, 2014, Kilpatrick passed Steve Logan for second all-time in Bearcats scoring history (behind Oscar Robertson). On February 28, he was named one of the 10 semi-finalists for the Naismith College Player of the Year.

For the season, he averaged 20.6 points per game and led the Bearcats to a 27–7 overall record and first place in the conference. He was named first-team All-American by the AP, USA Today, The Sporting News, Sports Illustrated, Bleacher Report and NBCSports.com. Overall, Kilpatrick was named a consensus second-team All-American.

Professional career

Santa Cruz Warriors (2014–2015) 
After going undrafted in the 2014 NBA draft, Kilpatrick joined the Philadelphia 76ers for the 2014 NBA Summer League. On October 20, 2014, he signed with the Golden State Warriors, but was waived four days later. On November 3, he was acquired by the Santa Cruz Warriors of the NBA Development League as an affiliate player of Golden State.

Minnesota Timberwolves / Delaware 87ers (2015) 
On January 21, 2015, Kilpatrick was traded to the Delaware 87ers, along with a first-round pick, in exchange for Ronald Roberts and the returning player rights to Darington Hobson.

On March 19, 2015, Kilpatrick signed a 10-day contract with the Minnesota Timberwolves. The Timberwolves were granted an NBA hardship exception for a 16th roster spot due to having four players out with injury. He made his NBA debut later that night, recording one rebound in 10 minutes of action as the Timberwolves defeated the New York Knicks 95–92 in overtime. He was not retained by the Timberwolves following the expiration of his 10-day contract on March 29. In four games for the Timberwolves, he averaged 5.5 points and 1.5 rebounds per game.

On March 29, 2015, Kilpatrick returned to the 87ers, where he played out the 2014–15 season. In 44 D-League games (22 for Santa Cruz, 22 for Delaware) over the course of the season, Kilpatrick averaged 13.9 points, 3.2 rebounds, 1.9 assists and 1.0 steals in 28.0 minutes per game.

Denver Nuggets / Return to the 87ers (2015–2016) 
In July 2015, Kilpatrick joined the Milwaukee Bucks for the 2015 NBA Summer League. On September 10, 2015, he signed with the New Orleans Pelicans. However, he was later waived by the Pelicans on October 23 after appearing in five preseason games. On November 17, he was reacquired by the Delaware 87ers.

On January 12, 2016, Kilpatrick signed a 10-day contract with the Denver Nuggets. Three days later, he made his debut for the Nuggets in a loss to the Miami Heat. On January 23, he signed a second 10-day contract with the Nuggets. Two days later, he had his best game as a Nugget, recording 11 points and 3 rebounds in a loss to the Atlanta Hawks. After his second 10-day contract expired, he was not offered a contract with the Nuggets for the rest of the season, and on February 2, he was reacquired by Delaware. He went on to play for the East All-Star team in the 2016 NBA D-League All-Star Game. At the season's end, he was named to the All-NBA D-League Third Team.

Brooklyn Nets (2016–2017) 
On February 28, 2016, Kilpatrick signed a 10-day contract with the Brooklyn Nets. On March 5, he scored a career-high 19 points in the Nets' 132–118 loss to the Minnesota Timberwolves. He went on to sign a second 10-day contract with the Nets on March 9, and tied his career high of 19 points on March 13 and March 15. On March 19, he signed a multi-year contract with the Nets. Three days later, he scored a career-high 25 points in a 105–100 loss to the Charlotte Hornets. On April 10, he set a new career high with 26 points in a 129–103 loss to the Indiana Pacers.

On October 28, 2016, Kilpatrick scored 18 points against the Indiana Pacers to record double figures in 21 of his first 25 games as a Net. On November 2, he recorded a season-high 24 points and a career-high 10 rebounds in a 109–101 win over the Detroit Pistons. On November 9, in his first career start, Kilpatrick scored in single figures for the first time in 2016–17, finishing with seven points, four rebounds and five assists in 28 minutes in a 110–96 loss to the New York Knicks. On November 29, he scored 31 of his career-high 38 points after the third quarter, as the Nets stopped a seven-game losing streak with a 127–122 double-overtime victory over the Los Angeles Clippers. He also had a career-best 14 rebounds in the game.

On December 7, 2017, following the trade in which Brooklyn acquired Jahlil Okafor and Nik Stauskas, the Nets waived Kilpatrick.

Milwaukee Bucks (2017–2018) 
On December 18, 2017, Kilpatrick signed a two-way contract with the Milwaukee Bucks. On January 7, 2018, the Bucks converted his two-way contract to a standard NBA contract. On March 2, 2018, he was waived by the Bucks.

Los Angeles Clippers (2018) 
On March 4, 2018, Kilpatrick signed a 10-day contract with the Los Angeles Clippers. On March 14, 2018, he signed a second 10-day contract with the Clippers. He parted ways with the Clippers following the expiration of his second 10-day contract.

Chicago Bulls (2018) 
On March 26, 2018, Kilpatrick signed with the Chicago Bulls. On July 12, 2018, he was waived by the Bulls.

Panathinaikos (2019)
On January 9, 2019, Kilpatrick signed with the EuroLeague club Panathinaikos. Named all star February 10. On February 17, 2019, Kilpatrick won Greek Basketball Cup in the big final against PAOK BC (79-73). The Final took place in Heraklion Indoor Sports Arena, Crete. This was for Sean his very first trophy in "green" and for Panathinaikos BC the 19th title in Greek Cup competition. Sean helped Panathinaikos to win another Championship, the 38th and third in a row for Greens, having 8.1 points, 1.9 rebounds, 1.6 assists and 0.7 steals in 20.3 minutes per game. In the play-off final series Panathinaikos beat Promitheas Patras with 3-0 wins.

Budućnost (2019–2020) 
On November 18, 2019, Kilpatrick signed with Budućnost of the Adriatic League.

Tofaş (2020)
On July 20, 2020, Kilpatrick signed with Tofaş of the Basketbol Süper Ligi (BSL).

Gran Canaria (2020–2021) 
On December 14, 2020, Kilpatrick signed with Herbalife Gran Canaria of the Spanish Liga ACB.

Hapoel Jerusalem (2021–2022) 
On August 25, 2021, Kilpatrick signed with Hapoel Jerusalem of the Israeli Premier League.

Fuijan Sturgeons (2022–present) 
On November 9, 2022, Kilpatrick signed with the Fujian Sturgeons of the Chinese Basketball Association (CBA).

Career statistics

NBA

Regular season

|-
| style="text-align:left;"| 
| style="text-align:left;"| Minnesota
| 4 || 0 || 18.0 || .350 || .308 || 1.000 || 1.5 || 1.0 || .8 || .0 || 5.5
|-
| style="text-align:left;"| 
| style="text-align:left;"| Denver
| 8 || 0 || 10.3 || .381 || .235 || .875 || .8 || .4 || .3 || .0 || 3.4
|-
| style="text-align:left;"| 
| style="text-align:left;"| Brooklyn
| 23 || 0 || 23.2 || .462 || .361 || .898 || 2.2 || 1.1 || .4 || .1 || 13.8
|-
| style="text-align:left;"| 
| style="text-align:left;"| Brooklyn
| 70 || 24 || 25.1 || .415 || .341 || .843 || 4.0 || 2.2 || .6 || .1 || 13.1
|-
| style="text-align:left;"| 
| style="text-align:left;"| Brooklyn
| 16 || 0 || 11.4 || .291 || .262 || .947 || 2.2 || .9 || .1 || .1 || 4.9
|-
| style="text-align:left;"| 
| style="text-align:left;"| Milwaukee
| 23 || 0 || 8.9 || .378 || .283 || .947 || 1.1 || .7 || .2 || .0 || 4.0
|-
| style="text-align:left;"| 
| style="text-align:left;"| L.A. Clippers
| 4 || 0 || 9.5 || .389 || .429  || 1.000 || .5 || .8 || .0 || .0 || 4.8
|-
| style="text-align:left;"| 
| style="text-align:left;"| Chicago
| 9 || 1 || 23.8 || .439 || .396 || .813 || 2.8 || 1.4 || .7 || .3 || 15.4
|- class="sortbottom"
| style="text-align:center;" colspan="2"| Career
| 157 || 25 || 19.6 || .413 || .335 || .862 || 2.7 || 1.5 || .5 || .1 || 10.3

EuroLeague

|-
| style="text-align:left;"| 2018–19
| style="text-align:left;"| Panathinaikos
| 15 || 14 || 21.1 || .494 || .333 || .933 || 1.7 || 1.1 || .9 || .3 || 9.2 || 6.3
|-
|- class="sortbottom"
| style="text-align:center;" colspan="2"| Career
| 15 || 14 || 21.1 || .494 || .333 || .933 || 1.7 || 1.1 || .9 || .3 || 9.2 || 6.3

References

External links

 Cincinnati Bearcats bio

1990 births
Living people
21st-century African-American sportspeople
African-American basketball players
All-American college men's basketball players
American expatriate basketball people in Greece
American expatriate basketball people in Montenegro
American expatriate basketball people in Spain
American expatriate basketball people in Turkey
American men's basketball players
Basketball players from New York (state)
Brooklyn Nets players
CB Gran Canaria players
Chicago Bulls players
Cincinnati Bearcats men's basketball players
Delaware 87ers players
Denver Nuggets players
Hapoel Jerusalem B.C. players
KK Budućnost players
Los Angeles Clippers players
Milwaukee Bucks players
Minnesota Timberwolves players
Panathinaikos B.C. players
People from White Plains, New York
Santa Cruz Warriors players
Shooting guards
Sportspeople from Yonkers, New York
Tofaş S.K. players
Undrafted National Basketball Association players
White Plains High School alumni